Balewo refers to the following places in Poland:

 Balewo, Pomeranian Voivodeship
 Balewo, Warmian-Masurian Voivodeship